Gusheh-ye Kasavand (also Romanized as Gūsheh-ye Kasāvand; also known as Gūsheh) is a village in Kamazan-e Olya Rural District, Zand District, Malayer County, Hamadan Province, Iran. At the 2006 census, its population was 374, in 103 families.

References 

Populated places in Malayer County